The Plague at the Karatas Village is a 2016 Kazakh film directed by Adilkhan Yerzhanov. The film is part of the Kazakh Partisan Cinema, a guerrilla filmmaking movement that aims to work without any governmental interference.

Plot
A new mayor arrives in a small Kazakh village and finds out there is a mysterious plague infecting the villagers, while locals insist it's only a flu.

Cast
 Aibek Kudabayev 
 Tolganay Talgat
 Nurbek Mukushev
 Konstantin Kozlov
 Baimurat Zhumanov
 Yerbolat Yerzhanov
 Ademoka

See also 
Cinema of Kazakhstan
Guerrilla filmmaking

References

External links

Kazakhstani drama films
Films set in Kazakhstan
Films shot in Kazakhstan
2010s Russian-language films
2016 films